Matt Eidson is an American politician. He is a Democrat representing District 43 in the North Dakota House of Representatives.

Personal life 
Eidson was in the United States Marine Corps from 2008 to 2015, and served in Iraq and Afghanistan. He earned a Bachelor of Arts degree from the University of North Dakota in 2018, and is currently pursuing a Master of Arts degree.

Political career 
In 2018, Matt Eidson ran for election to one of two District 43 seats in the North Dakota House of Representatives. He and fellow Democrat Mary Adams won, defeating Republicans Ben Olson and incumbent Richard Becker.

As of June 2020, Eidson sits on the following committees:
 Higher Education Interim Committee
 Taxation Interim Committee
 Energy and Natural Resources Standing Committee
 Finance and Taxation Standing Committee

Electoral record

References 

Democratic Party members of the North Dakota House of Representatives
Living people
Year of birth missing (living people)